Pu'anxian railway station (literally Pu'an County railway station) is a railway station of Hangchangkun Passenger Railway located in Guizhou, People's Republic of China, nearby Hutiaohe Bridge.

References

Railway stations in Guizhou